Brendan Arnold Maher (31 October 1924 – 17 March 2009)  was a psychology professor at Harvard University who pioneered the scientific study of psychology in the laboratory, and laid the groundwork for the study of psychology and its relationship to genetics. Maher was most interested in human psychopathology, especially schizophrenia. One of his major contributions was to introduce laboratory experimentation strategies to research of this mental illness. Maher also mentored many students through their own research projects at Harvard, Ohio State University, Northwestern University, Louisiana State University, University of Wisconsin, and Brandeis University, where he served as Dean of the Faculty.

See also
 Martha Mitchell effect

References

1924 births
2009 deaths
Psychology educators
20th-century American psychologists
Harvard University faculty
British emigrants to the United States